De Croo is a surname. Notable people with the surname include:
Alexander De Croo (born 1975), Belgian politician and businessman 
Herman De Croo (born 1937), Belgian politician

Dutch-language surnames
Surnames of Belgian origin